Susan Southard is an American non-fiction writer. She won the 2016 J. Anthony Lukas Book Prize and the Dayton Literary Peace Prize, for her book Nagasaki: Life After Nuclear War.

Life
Southard graduated from Antioch University, Los Angeles, with an MFA in creative writing. She has written for The New York Times, the Los Angeles Times, Politico, and Lapham’s Quarterly.

Works 
Nagasaki: Life After Nuclear War, New York, New York : Penguin Books, 2016. ,

References

External links 
Official website

21st-century American non-fiction writers
Living people
American women non-fiction writers
21st-century American women writers
Year of birth missing (living people)